Emajuddin Ahamed (15 December 1933 – 17 July 2020) was a Bangladeshi political scientist, author and educationist. He served as the 21st vice-chancellor of the University of Dhaka during 1992–1996. He was awarded Ekushey Padak in 1992 by the Government of Bangladesh in the education category.

Early life and education
Ahamed was born in Malda district in West Bengal in the then British India. He later moved to the Chapai Nawabganj District in Bangladesh with his family. Ahamed received his early education in Rajshahi. He got his bachelor's degree from Rajshahi College. He then joined the civil service as a lecturer of government college. He became the principal of the college. In the mid-1970s, he was granted a scholarship by the Queen's University in Ontario, Canada when he earned a PhD degree for his research in political science.

Career
Upon returning to Bangladesh, Ahamed joined the University of Dhaka as a senior lecturer in the department of political science. He later became a professor. He started writing about his research and reviews of the general politics of the nation. He wrote numerous books on national politics.

Ahamed served two terms as the pro-vice chancellor before becoming the vice chancellor of Dhaka University in 1992. He retired in 1996. He became the vice-chancellor of the University of Development Alternative in 2002. He also worked with the Asiatic Society of Bangladesh.

Ahamed was awarded the Ekushey Padak in 1992 for his contribution to education.

Personal life 
Emajuddin Ahamed was married to Begum Selima Ahamed. The couple had five children, three daughters and two sons, and eleven grandchildren. Their youngest daughter died in 1997. He is the father of Dil Rowshan Zinnat Ara Nazneen, Professor of Political Science at the University of Dhaka, Bangladesh and Tanwir Iqbal Ibn Ahamed, Associate Professor of Respiratory Medicine and grandfather of Tarnima Warda Andalib, Post Doctoral Researcher at University Sains Malaysia, Malaysia.

Awards 
Ahamed received several academic awards. The most specific ones are: Ekushey Padak in 1992. Mahakal Krishti Chinta Shangha Gold Medal, Jatiya Shahitya Sangshad Gold Medal, Zia Sangskritik Gold Medal, Michael Madhushudan Datta Gold Medal, Dhaka Shamajik ebong Shangskritik Gold Medal, Bangladesh Jubok Front Gold Medal, Rajshahi Forum Unnoyon Gold Medal.

Death 
Ahamed died on 17 July 2020 aged 86 at Lab Aid Hospital in Dhaka due to cardiac arrest.

References

External links
 catalogue.nla.gov.au
 

1933 births
2020 deaths
People from Malda district
Rajshahi College alumni
Queen's University at Kingston alumni
Academic staff of the University of Dhaka
Vice-Chancellors of the University of Dhaka
Bangladeshi male writers
Recipients of the Ekushey Padak